Bauman is a surname. It may be a respelling of the German name Baumann, or it may be the Russian, Ashkenazi Jewish or Scandinavian spelling of the same name. 
 
Notable people with the surname include:

 Christopher Bauman (1982–2005), American professional wrestler
 David F. Bauman, New Jersey Superior Court judge
 Elise Bauman (born 1990), Canadian actress
 Eric Bauman, creator of eBaum's World
 Jay Bauman, filmmaker from Milwaukee, Wisconsin
Karl Bauman (1892–1937), Soviet politician
 Joe Bauman (1922–2005), American baseball first baseman
 Jon Bauman (born 1947), American musician, member of musical group Sha Na Na
 Louis Bauman (1875–1950), American fundamentalist minister, writer, and bible conference speaker
 Michael Bauman (born 1950), American theologian, author, world cycling champion
 Mordecai Bauman (1912–2007), American baritone
 Nikolay Bauman (1873–1905), Russian revolutionary
 Richard Bauman, American folklorist, linguistic anthropologist, and American studies scholar
 Richard W. Bauman (born 1951), Canadian law professor and legal theorist
 Robert Bauman (born 1937), American politician
 Robert J. Bauman, Chief Justice of the Supreme Court of British Columbia since 2009
 Schamyl Bauman (died 1966), Swedish film director
 Zygmunt Bauman (1925–2017), Polish  sociologist philosopher

See also 
 Baumann (disambiguation), Bowman
 Bauman MSTU, Russian Technical University in Moscow
 Bauman Street, shopping street in Kazan
 Baumanskaya, Moscow metro station
 , a United States Navy patrol vessel that served from 1917 to 1919.

German-language surnames
Jewish surnames